Iowa State University's College of Human Sciences was established in 2005, as the result of a merger of the now defunct College of Education and College of Family and Consumer Sciences, and therefore, is currently the newest college of Iowa State University.

History 

The College of Human Sciences traces its history to the College of Home Economics. The home economics program at Iowa State began in 1872.

Formed in 1968, the College of Education at Iowa State University was composed of three academic departments, Curriculum & Instruction, Educational Leadership & Policy Studies, and Health and Human Performance.

References

External links 
Iowa State College of Human Sciences

Human Sciences
2005 establishments in Iowa